The Lee Huff Apartment Complex is a building in Grand Island, Nebraska. Two flats and the garage were built in 1920–1921, and the apartment complex was completed by Paul Sothman in 1928. It was designed in the Renaissance Revival style by architect James Allen. It has been listed on the National Register of Historic Places since July 1, 1994.

References

External links

	
National Register of Historic Places in Hall County, Nebraska
Renaissance Revival architecture in Nebraska
Residential buildings completed in 1920